Peter Sauerbruch (5 June 1913 – 29 September 2010) was a highly decorated Oberstleutnant i.G. in the Wehrmacht during World War II. He was also a recipient of the Knight's Cross of the Iron Cross.

Awards and decorations
 Iron Cross (1939)
 2nd Class 
 1st Class 
 Panzer Badge
 Eastern Front Medal
 German Cross in Gold (30 December 1944)
 Knight's Cross of the Iron Cross on 4 January 1943 as Hauptmann im Generalstab and Ib (Quartermaster general) of the 14. Panzer-Division and leader of Kampfgruppe "Sauerbruch"

References

Citations

Bibliography

External links
TracesOfWar.com
Ritterkreuztraeger 1939-1945
Lexikon der Wehrmacht

1913 births
2010 deaths
Military personnel from Zürich
Reichswehr personnel
Recipients of the Gold German Cross
Recipients of the Knight's Cross of the Iron Cross
German prisoners of war in World War II held by the United States
German expatriates in Switzerland